Charles H. Sperry was a teacher, state legislator, and carpenter in South Carolina. He represented Georgetown County in the South Carolina House of Representatives  from 1872 to 1874.

He enrolled in law school. In 1880 he was recorded as being a carpenter.

References

1840s births
African-American state legislators in South Carolina
Educators from South Carolina
Members of the South Carolina House of Representatives
People from Georgetown, South Carolina
Year of death missing